Pseudoclanis postica is a moth of the family Sphingidae first described by Francis Walker in 1856. It is known from South Africa and Zimbabwe.

The wingspan is 73–95 mm.

The larvae feed on Celtis species, Trema species, Chaetachme aristata, Ficus ingens.

References

Pseudoclanis
Moths described in 1856
Moths of Africa
Lepidoptera of South Africa